Bishopston is the name of an electoral ward in the City and County of Swansea, Wales.   Most of the area is rural consisting of farmland and small villages.  The ward is named after the village (and coterminous community) of Bishopston which falls within the ward.

The electoral ward consists of some or all of the following areas: Barland Common, Caswell, Clyne Common, Bishopston, Manselfield, Murton, Oldway, in the parliamentary constituency of Gower.  It is bounded by the Bristol Channel to the south; and the wards of: Pennard to the west; Fairwood to the north; and Mayals, West Cross and Newton to the east.

Current Representation
The Bishopston Ward is a single-member ward for the purposes of City and County of Swansea Council elections. Following the 2017 election it is currently represented by Conservative councillor Lyndon Richard Jones who defeated long-serving Independent Keith Marsh.

Bishopston (one seat)

Recent history
The first election to the new unitary City and County of Swansea Council took place in 1995. The seat was won by the Liberal Democrats.

In 1999, the seat was won by an Independent who was returned unopposed.

Keith Marsh comfortably held the seat in 2004

In 2008, Keith Marsh was again returned but with a reduced majority.

Keith Marsh was returned for a fourth time at the 2012 election.

References

External links
 Bishopston.org.uk Community Website

Swansea electoral wards